Chris Meke Walasi (born 18 May 1980) is a sprinter from the Solomon Islands. He came sixth in Heat 3 of the 100 metres Preliminaries at the 2012 Summer Olympics.

Personal bests

Achievements

References

External links
 
 

1980 births
Living people
People from Malaita Province
Solomon Islands male sprinters
Athletes (track and field) at the 2006 Commonwealth Games
Athletes (track and field) at the 2010 Commonwealth Games
Athletes (track and field) at the 2012 Summer Olympics
Olympic athletes of the Solomon Islands
Commonwealth Games competitors for the Solomon Islands